The 2015–16 Howard Bison men's basketball team represented Howard University during the 2015–16 NCAA Division I men's basketball season. The Bison, led by sixth year head coach Kevin Nickelberry, played their home games at the Burr Gymnasium and were members of the Mid-Eastern Athletic Conference. They finished the season 12–20, 6–10 in MEAC play to finish in a three way tie for ninth place. They lost in the first round of the MEAC tournament to North Carolina Central.

Roster

Schedule

|-
!colspan=9 style="background:#; color:white;"|Regular season

|-
!colspan=9 style="background:#; color:white;"| MEAC tournament

References

Howard Bison men's basketball seasons
Howard
Howard Bison basketball team
Howard Bison basketball team